Oña is a municipality and town located in the province of Burgos, Castile and León, Spain. According to the 2011 census (INE), the municipality has a population of 1,219 inhabitants.

Main sights 
 Benedictine monastery of San Salvador de Oña (11th century). During 2012, the town hosted the 17th edition of the sacred art exhibition Las Edades del Hombre.
 El jardín secreto, an outdoor walk and art exhibit by local artists.

People from Oña
 Andrés de Olmos (1485 – 8 October 1571) – Catholic church priest and grammarian and ethno-historian of Mexico's Indians
 Martina Ibaibarriaga  (1788–1849) – soldier

References

External links

Municipalities in the Province of Burgos